Gems is the twelfth studio album by American singer Patti LaBelle. It was released by MCA Records on June 7, 1994, in the United States. The album features a hip-hop-esque remake of DeBarge's 1983 hit, "All This Love", produced by Teddy Riley. Gems peaked at number forty-eight on the US Billboard 200 and went gold with sales shipping past the 500,000 mark. The album is notable for the single "The Right Kinda Lover", which brought LaBelle a new legion of fans thanks to its production by Jimmy Jam and Terry Lewis and its video which had LaBelle performing a seductress who chooses "the right mate" through a machine and if one man rubbed her the wrong way, she'd use a button to get rid of them.

Critical reception

AllMusic editor Jose F. Promis found that Gems "doesn't necessarily rank as one of the singer's crowning achievements, but as the title (and cliché) implies, this set certainly offers more than a few gems to unearth. Gems also features a couple of prolific productions courtesy of Jimmy Jam and Terry Lewis (on the set's up-tempo first single, "The Right Kinda Lover") and new jack swing maestro Teddy Riley (on LaBelle's mellow yet hypnotic cover of DeBarge's "All This Love"). The true standout, however, is "Stay in My Corner." That song, with its gospel undertones, features Labelle wailing as only she can, holding out her famous long notes and delivering a truly mesmerizing performance."

Track listing

Charts

Weekly charts

Year-end charts

Certifications

References

1994 albums
Patti LaBelle albums
Albums produced by Jimmy Jam and Terry Lewis
albums produced by Teddy Riley
MCA Records albums